Ahmad Diyab is a Syrian former politician who worked as the head of the National Security Bureau.

References 

Members of the Regional Command of the Arab Socialist Ba'ath Party – Syria Region
Syrian politicians
Living people
Year of birth missing (living people)